The 1996 African Cup of Champions Clubs was the 32nd edition of the annual international club football competition held in the CAF region (Africa), the African Cup of Champions Clubs. It determined that year's club champion of association football in Africa.

Zamalek from Egypt won that final, and became for the fourth time CAF club champion.

Preliminary round

|}
1 Toffa Cotonou withdrew after the first leg. 
2 ASC Sonalec were disqualified for late payment of the entry fee. 
3 FACA withdrew after the first leg.

First round

|}

1 RC Bafoussam withdrew after 1st leg, and Fantastique FC advanced to Second Round.

Second round

|}

Quarterfinal

|}

Semifinal

|}

Final

Winners

Top scorers

The top scorers from the 1996 African Cup of Champions Clubs are as follows:

References
African Club Competitions 1996 - rsssf.com

 
1996 in African football
African Cup of Champions Clubs